Malu Perez Iser is a Cuban Paralympic athlete. The documentary Yo soy Malú, which debuted at the Havana Film Festival, followed her life from her injury to her bronze medal run at the 2016 Summer Paralympics.

References

Living people
Cuban amputees
Cuban female long jumpers
Paralympic athletes of Cuba
Medalists at the 2016 Summer Paralympics
Paralympic bronze medalists for Cuba
Athletes (track and field) at the 2016 Summer Paralympics
Paralympic medalists in athletics (track and field)
Year of birth missing (living people)
21st-century Cuban women